Joseph Romano may refer to:

 Yossef Romano (1940–1972), Italian-born Israeli weightlifter
 Joseph L. Romano, officer in the United States Air Force